Fan Di (born 25 February 1973) is a former Chinese artistic gymnast. She was the 1989 World Champion on the uneven bars, and was only the second Chinese female gymnast to become a World Champion after Ma Yanhong in 1979. She also won a bronze medal with her team at those World Championships. In 1987, Fan competed at the World Championships where the Chinese team finished in fourth. Individually, she finished 20th in the all-around and sixth on bars. Fan represented China at the 1988 Summer Olympics where China was sixth in the team final, and Fan finished 20th in the all-around final. Fan Di's final competition before retirement was the 1990 Asian Games. She won gold with her team and on the uneven bars.

References 

1973 births
Living people
World champion gymnasts
Chinese female artistic gymnasts
Gymnasts at the 1988 Summer Olympics
Olympic gymnasts of China
Asian Games medalists in gymnastics
Gymnasts at the 1990 Asian Games
Medalists at the World Artistic Gymnastics Championships
Asian Games gold medalists for China
Medalists at the 1990 Asian Games